The 1999 Uzbek League season was the 8th edition of top level football in Uzbekistan since independence from the Soviet Union in 1992.

Overview
It was contested by 16 teams, and Do'stlik won the championship.

League standings

References
Uzbekistan – List of final tables (RSSSF)

Uzbekistan Super League seasons
1
Uzbek
Uzbek